Harry Humes (born June 5, 1935, in Girardville, Pennsylvania) is an American poet, short-story writer, professor, and editor.

Life
He joined the army in 1958. He graduated from Bloomsburg State College in 1964, and the University of North Carolina at Greensboro, with a Master of Fine Arts in 1967. He taught at Kutztown University, from 1968 to 1999.

His work has appeared in West Branch, Antaeus, Gettysburg Review, Massachusetts Review, Poetry, Poetry Northwest, Prairie Schooner, Tar River Poetry, and The Virginia Quarterly Review.  He also was editor of Yarrow and Stone Country Poetry Journal. His first poetry collection, Winter Weeds, was published in his 40s, in 1983.

Awards
 Devins Award, from the University of Missouri Press
 Theodore Roethke Poetry Prize, Poetry Northwest
 1998 National Poetry Series, for Butterfly Effect
 1990 National Endowment for the Arts Poetry Fellowship
 Pennsylvania Council on the Arts grants
 2007 Keystone Chapbook Competition, for “Underground Singing”

Works
Man with a Yellow Pail , Greensboro Review, Spring 2005]
Flocking , Beloit Poetry Journal
 
 
 
 
 
 
 
 
 
 
   (chapbook)
   (chapbook)

Anthologies

References

External links

1935 births
Living people
American male poets
People from Berks County, Pennsylvania
People from Schuylkill County, Pennsylvania
Bloomsburg University of Pennsylvania alumni
University of North Carolina at Greensboro alumni
Kutztown University of Pennsylvania alumni
Chapbook writers